The Patrick Murphy House is a historic house at 345 Palisado Avenue in Windsor, Connecticut.  Built about 1873, it is a good example of Italianate architecture executed in brick.  It was listed on the National Register of Historic Places in 1988.

Description and history
The Patrick Murphy House is located north of the Windsor town center, on the west side of Palisado Avenue (Connecticut Route 159) between Kennedy Road and Old Kennedy Road. Palisado Road is historically the major north–south road on the west bank of the Connecticut River.  The house is a two-story brick building, with a low-pitch hip roof. It is basically rectangular, with a slightly projecting rectangular section on the left side.  The roof has an extended eave, and there are a few small windows set just below the eave in the attic level.  The main facade is three bays wide, with the main entrance in the rightmost bay, flanked by sidelight windows.  A single-story porch extends across the front and around the left side to the projecting section.  It has turned posts with decorative brackets at the top, and slender turned balusters.  Windows under the porch are of full length, while other windows are set in rectangular openings with brownstone sills and lintels. A two-story ell with porch extends to the rear of the main block, and there is a period carriage house on the property

The house was built about 1873; it is one of several Italianate brick houses in Windsor, and makes a part of 19th-century streetscape of the Palisado Avenue Historic District.

See also
National Register of Historic Places listings in Windsor, Connecticut

References

Houses on the National Register of Historic Places in Connecticut
National Register of Historic Places in Hartford County, Connecticut
Italianate architecture in Connecticut
Houses completed in 1873
Houses in Hartford County, Connecticut